Entheogens are psychoactive substances that induce alterations in perception, mood, consciousness, cognition, or behavior for the purposes of engendering spiritual development or otherwise in sacred contexts. Anthropological study has established that entheogens are used for religious, magical, shamanic, or spiritual purposes in many parts of the world. Entheogens have traditionally been used to supplement many diverse practices geared towards achieving transcendence, including divination, meditation, yoga, sensory deprivation, healings, asceticism, prayer, trance, rituals, chanting, imitation of sounds, hymns like peyote songs, drumming, and ecstatic dance. The psychedelic experience is often compared to non-ordinary forms of consciousness such as those experienced in meditation, near-death experiences, and mystical experiences. Ego dissolution is often described as a key feature of the psychedelic experience.

Nomenclature

The neologism entheogen was coined in 1979 by a group of ethnobotanists and scholars of mythology (Carl A. P. Ruck, Jeremy Bigwood, Danny Staples, Richard Evans Schultes, Jonathan Ott and R. Gordon Wasson). The adjective  translates to English as "full of the god, inspired, possessed," and is the root of the English word "enthusiasm." The Greeks used it as praise for poets and other artists.  means "to come into being". Thus, an entheogen is a drug that causes one to become inspired or to experience feelings of inspiration, often in a religious or "spiritual" manner.

Ruck et al. argued that the term hallucinogen was inappropriate owing to its etymological relationship to words relating to delirium and insanity. The term psychedelic was also seen as problematic, owing to the similarity in sound to words about psychosis and also because it had become irreversibly associated with various connotations of the 1960s pop culture. In modern usage, entheogen may be used synonymously with these terms, or it may be chosen to contrast with recreational use of the same drugs. The meanings of the term entheogen was formally defined by Ruck et al.:

In 2004, David E. Nichols wrote the following about the nomenclature used for serotonergic hallucinogens:

History

Entheogens have been used by indigenous peoples for thousands of years. Hemp seeds discovered by archaeologists at Pazyryk suggest early ceremonial practices by the Scythians occurred during the 5th to 2nd century BCE, confirming previous historical reports by Herodotus. Giorgio Samorini has proposed several examples of the cultural use of entheogens that are found in the archaeological record, some conclusions of which have been called into question by R. Gordon Wasson and Erwin Panofsky and other art historians (see the Christianity section, below). 

According to Ruck, Eyan, and Staples, the familiar shamanic entheogen of which the Indo-Europeans brought knowledge was Amanita muscaria. This fungus could not be cultivated and thus had to be gathered from the wild, making its use compatible with a nomadic lifestyle rather than a settled agriculturalist. When they reached the world of the Caucasus and the Aegean, the Indo-Europeans encountered wine, the entheogen of Dionysus, who brought it with him from his birthplace in the mythical Nysa when he returned to claim his Olympian birthright. The Indo-European proto-Greeks "recognized it as the entheogen of Zeus, and their own traditions of shamanism, the Amanita and the 'pressed juice' of Somabut better, since no longer unpredictable and wild, the way it was found among the Hyperboreans: as befit their own assimilation of agrarian modes of life, the entheogen was now cultivable." Robert Graves, in his foreword to The Greek Myths, hypothesizes that the ambrosia of various pre-Hellenic tribes was Amanita muscaria and perhaps psilocybin mushrooms of the genus Panaeolus. Amanita muscaria was regarded as divine food, according to Ruck and Staples, not something to be indulged in, sampled lightly, or profaned. It was seen as the food of the gods, their ambrosia, and as mediating between the two realms, and it was said that Tantalus's crime was inviting commoners to share his ambrosia.

Uses

Entheogens have been used in various ways, e.g., as part of established religious rituals or as aids for personal spiritual development ("plant teachers").

In religion 

Shamans all over the world and in different cultures have traditionally used entheogens, especially psychedelics, for their religious experiences. In these communities the absorption of drugs leads to dreams (visions) through sensory distortion. The psychedelic experience is often compared to non-ordinary forms of consciousness such as those experienced in meditation, and mystical experiences. Ego dissolution is often described as a key feature of the psychedelic experience.

Entheogens used in the contemporary world include biota like peyote (Native American Church), extracts like ayahuasca (Santo Daime, União do Vegetal), and synthetic drugs like 2C-B (Sangoma, Nyanga, and Amagqirha).
Entheogens also play an important role in contemporary religious movements such as the Rastafari movement.

Hinduism 

Bhang is an edible preparation of cannabis native to the Indian subcontinent. It has been used in food and drink as early as 1000 BCE by Hindus in ancient India.
The earliest known reports regarding the sacred status of cannabis in the Indian subcontinent come from the Atharva Veda estimated to have been written sometime around 2000–1400 BCE, which mentions cannabis as one of the "five sacred plants... which release us from anxiety" and that a guardian angel resides in its leaves. The Vedas also refer to it as a "source of happiness," "joy-giver," and "liberator," and in the Raja Valabba, the gods send hemp to the human race.

Buddhism 

It has been suggested that the Amanita muscaria mushroom was used by the Tantric Buddhist mahasiddha tradition of the 8th to 12th century.

In the West, some modern Buddhist teachers have written about the usefulness of psychedelics. The Buddhist magazine Tricycle devoted their entire fall 1996 edition to this issue. Some teachers such as Jack Kornfield have suggested the possibility that psychedelics could complement Buddhist practice, bring healing and help people understand their connection with everything which could lead to compassion. Kornfield warns however that addiction can still be a hindrance. Other teachers, such as Michelle McDonald-Smith, expressed views that saw entheogens as not conducive to Buddhist practice ("I don't see them developing anything").

The fifth of the Pancasila, the ethical code in the Theravada and Mahayana Buddhist traditions, states that adherents must: "abstain from fermented and distilled beverages that cause heedlessness." The Pali Canon, the scripture of Theravada Buddhism, depicts refraining from alcohol as essential to moral conduct because intoxication causes a loss of mindfulness. Although the Fifth Precept only names a specific wine and cider, this has traditionally been interpreted to mean all alcoholic beverages.

Judaism 

The primary advocate of the religious use of cannabis in early Judaism was Polish anthropologist Sula Benet, who claimed that the plant kaneh bosem קְנֵה-בֹשֶׂם mentioned five times in the Hebrew Bible, and used in the holy anointing oil of the Book of Exodus, was cannabis. According to theories that hold that cannabis was present in Ancient Israelite society, a variant of hashish is held to have been present. In 2020, it was announced that cannabis residue had been found on the Israelite sanctuary altar at Tel Arad dating to the 8th century BCE of the Kingdom of Judah, suggesting that cannabis was a part of some Israelite rituals at the time.

While Benet's conclusion regarding the psychoactive use of cannabis is not universally accepted among Jewish scholars, there is general agreement that cannabis is used in Talmudic sources to refer to hemp fibers, not hashish, as hemp was a vital commodity before linen replaced it. Lexicons of Hebrew and dictionaries of plants of the Bible such as by Michael Zohary (1985), Hans Arne Jensen (2004), and James A. Duke (2010) and others identify the plant in question as either Acorus calamus or Cymbopogon citratus, not cannabis.

It has also been suggested by one author that, in modern times, cannabis can be used within Judaism to induce religious experiences.

Christianity 

Alcohol was clearly used, historically, in Christian religious ceremonies, i.e., that of the Eucharist or Lord's Supper (i.e., Communion practices), where Christians consume bread and wine as elements in remembrance of the broken body and shed blood of Jesus Christ. In the Christian biblical writings, which date to antiquity, both the common use of wine and the subject of the abuse of alcohol are subjects that appear (in the latter case, indicating it was a popular issue requiring address). In many modern contexts of Eucharistic and related practices, in particular, those in Protestant congregations, grape juice often substitutes for wine, and in Catholic and Orthodox, the amount of wine consumed in modern ceremonies is, in any case, far below the levels required for the participant to have an entheogenic experience. 

Apart from alcohol, Christian denominations otherwise generally disapprove of the use of most drugs used illicitly in pursuit of entheogenic experiences. David Hillman, in a major work on medicative and recreational drug use in Greek and Roman antiquity, suggests that drug use was indeed found in the early history of the Church, although this was a component argument rejected by his doctoral committee and so did not appear in his dissertation. Generally speaking, Michael Winkelman, writing in 2019, argues in support of the role of "psilocybin mushrooms in the ancient evolution of human religions," stating that:This prehistoric mycolatry persisted into the historic era in the major religious traditions of the world, which often left evidence of these practices in sculpture, art, and scriptures. ... But even through new entheogenic combinations were introduced, complex societies generally removed entheogens from widespread consumption, restricted them in private and exclusive spiritual practices of the leaders, and often carried out repressive punishment of those who engaged in entheogenic practices. As of this date, the question of the extent of entheogen use in practices through Christian history is viewed as remaining poorly considered by academic or independent scholars.

 

The question of whether visionary plants were used in pre-Theodosian Christianity, including by heretical or quasi-Christian groups, was reported by Celdrán and Ruck to be distinct from the extent to which visionary plants were utilized or forgotten in later Christianity. The same is true of the question of possible distinctives of use by groups within orthodox Catholic practice, e.g., elites versus laity (e.g., where Ruck and colleagues suggest use of Datura by early Spanish church elites, based on appearances of the plant of origin in images). In 2001, classical philologist Mark Hoffman and colleagues suggested widespread use of "visionary" (entheogenic) plants in cultures surrounding the emerging Christian movement, and so too in among early Christians, with a gradual reduction of the use of entheogens in Christianity over history. 

Jan Irvin and Michael Hoffman—the former including both authors in their publication, but the latter omitting the former in his—argue strongly in 2007 in the The Journal of Higher Criticism for revision of the classical rejection of a strong entheogenic presence in Christian art and history, stating:It is most remarkable that none of these scholars–Ramsbottom, Panofsky, Wasson, or Allegro–explicitly consider and address the question, “What was the extent of entheogen use throughout Christian history and in the surrounding cultural context?” Wasson and Allegro share the unexamined and untested assumption that while entheogen use was the original inspiration for religions, it was vanishingly rare in Christianity and the surrounding culture. These authors go on to state their perspective, at odds with Panofsky, Wasson, and others, and argue that the opposing scholars' "unjustified combination of premises has resulted in a standoff of positions", and that their scholarly opponents' historic objection to entheogenic arguments "all share the same shaky foundation, producing inconsistencies and self-contradictions."

The response follows from the appearance, in R. Gordon Wasson's book, Soma, of a letter from art historian Erwin Panofsky (and arguments surrounding the same) that communicate that art scholars were aware of "mushroom trees" in "Romanesque and early Gothic art", but that "the plant [in the fresco in question had] nothing whatever to do with mushrooms", going on to state that "the similarity with Amanita muscaria is purely fortuitous". Panofsky continues:The Plaincourault fresco is only one example - and, since the style is provincial, a particularly deceptive one—of a conventionalized tree type, prevalent in Romanesque and early Gothic art, which art historians actually refer to as a ‘mushroom tree’ or in German, Pilzbaum.  It comes about by the gradual schematization of the impressionistically rendered Italian pine tree in Roman and early Christian painting, and there are hundreds of instances exemplifying this development—unknown of course to mycologists. ... What the mycologists have overlooked is that the medieval artists hardly ever worked from nature but from classical prototypes which in the course of repeated copying became quite unrecognizable.

Peyotism 

The Native American Church (NAC) is also known as Peyotism and Peyote Religion. Peyotism is a Native American religion characterized by mixed traditional as well as Protestant beliefs and by sacramental use of the entheogen peyote.

The Peyote Way Church of God believes that "Peyote is a holy sacrament when taken according to our sacramental procedure and combined with a holistic lifestyle."

Santo Daime
Santo Daime is a syncretic religion founded in the 1930s in the Brazilian Amazonian state of Acre by Raimundo Irineu Serra, known as Mestre Irineu. Santo Daime incorporates elements of several religious or spiritual traditions, including Folk Catholicism, Kardecist Spiritism, African animism and indigenous South American shamanism, including vegetalismo.

Ceremonies – trabalhos (Brazilian Portuguese for "works") – are typically several hours long and are undertaken sitting in silent "concentration," or sung collectively, dancing according to simple steps in geometrical formation. Ayahuasca referred to as Daime within the practice, which contains several psychoactive compounds, is drunk as part of the ceremony. The drinking of Daime can induce a strong emetic effect which is embraced as both emotional and physical purging.

União do Vegetal
União do Vegetal (UDV) is a religious society founded on July 22, 1961, by José Gabriel da Costa, known as Mestre Gabriel. The translation of União do Vegetal is Union of the Plants referring to the sacrament of the UDV, Hoasca tea (also known as ayahuasca). This beverage is made by boiling two plants, Mariri (Banisteriopsis caapi) and Chacrona (Psychotria viridis), both of which are native to the Amazon rainforest.

In its sessions, UDV members drink Hoasca Tea for the effect of mental concentration. In Brazil, the use of Hoasca in religious rituals was regulated by the Brazilian Federal Government's National Drug Policy Council on January 25, 2010. The policy established legal norms for the religious institutions that responsibly use this tea.  In 2006, in the case of Gonzales v. O Centro Espírita Beneficente União do Vegetal, the Supreme Court of the United States unanimously affirmed the UDV's right to use Hoasca tea in its religious sessions in the United States.

By region

Africa 

The best-known entheogen-using culture of Africa is the Bwitists, who used a preparation of the root bark of Tabernanthe iboga. Although the ancient Egyptians may have been using the sacred blue lily plant in some of their religious rituals or just symbolically, it has been suggested that Egyptian religion once revolved around the ritualistic ingestion of the far more psychoactive Psilocybe cubensis mushroom, and that the Egyptian White Crown, Triple Crown, and Atef Crown were evidently designed to represent pin-stages of this mushroom. There is also evidence for the use of psilocybin mushrooms in Ivory Coast. Numerous other plants used in shamanic ritual in Africa, such as Silene capensis sacred to the Xhosa, are yet to be investigated by western science. A recent revitalization has occurred in the study of southern African psychoactives and entheogens (Mitchell and Hudson 2004; Sobiecki 2002, 2008, 2012).

Among the amaXhosa, the artificial drug 2C-B is used as entheogen by traditional healers or amagqirha over their traditional plants; they refer to the chemical as Ubulawu Nomathotholo, which roughly translates to "Medicine of the Singing Ancestors".

Americas 

Entheogens have played a pivotal role in the spiritual practices of most American cultures for millennia. The first American entheogen to be subject to scientific analysis was the peyote cactus (Lophophora williamsii). One of the founders of modern ethno-botany, Richard Evans Schultes of Harvard University documented the ritual use of peyote cactus among the Kiowa, who live in what became Oklahoma. While it was used traditionally by many cultures of what is now Mexico, in the 19th century its use spread throughout North America, replacing the toxic mescal bean (Calia secundiflora). Other well-known entheogens used by Mexican cultures include the alcoholic Aztec sacrament, pulque, ritual tobacco (known as "picietl" to the Aztecs, and "sikar" to the Maya, from where the word "cigar" derives), psilocybin mushrooms, morning glories (Ipomoea tricolor and Turbina corymbosa), and Salvia divinorum.

Datura wrightii is sacred to some Native Americans and has been used in ceremonies and rites of passage by Chumash, Tongva, and others. Among the Chumash, when a boy was 8 years old, his mother would give him a preparation of momoy to drink. This supposed spiritual challenge should help the boy develop the spiritual wellbeing that is required to become a man. Not all of the boys undergoing this ritual survived. Momoy was also used to enhance spiritual wellbeing among adults. For instance, during a frightening situation, such as when seeing a coyote walk like a man, a leaf of momoy was sucked to help keep the soul in the body.

The mescal bean Sophora secundiflora was used by the shamanic hunter-gatherer cultures of the Great Plains region. Other plants with ritual significance in North American shamanism are the hallucinogenic seeds of the Texas buckeye and jimsonweed (Datura stramonium). Paleoethnobotanical evidence for these plants from archaeological sites shows they were used in ancient times thousands of years ago.

In South America there is a long tradition of using the Mescaline-containing cactus Echinopsis pachanoi. Archaeological studies have found evidence of use going back to the pre-Columbian era, to Moche culture, Nazca culture, and Chavín culture.

Asia 
In the mountains of western China, significant traces of THC, the compound responsible for cannabis’ psychoactive effects, have been found in wooden bowls, or braziers, excavated from a 2,500-year-old cemetery.

John Marco Allegro argued that early Jewish and Christian cultic practice was based on the use of Amanita muscaria, which was later forgotten by its adherents, but this view has been widely disputed.

Europe 
In 440 BCE, Herodotus in Book IV of the Histories, documents that the Scythians inhaled cannabis in funeral ceremonies, stating they "take some of this hemp-seed, and … throw it upon the red hot stones" and when it released a vapor, the "Scyths, delighted, shout[ed] for joy."

A theory that naturally-occurring gases like ethylene used by inhalation may have played a role in divinatory ceremonies at Delphi in Classical Greece received popular press attention in the early 2000s, yet has not been conclusively proven.

Mushroom consumption is part of the culture of Europeans in general, with particular importance to Slavic and Baltic peoples. Some academics argue that the use of psilocybin- and/or muscimol-containing mushrooms was an integral part of the ancient culture of the Rus' people.

Oceania 
There are no known uses of entheogens by the Māori of New Zealand aside from a variant species of kava, although some modern scholars have claimed that there may be evidence of psilocybin mushroom use. Natives of Papua New Guinea are known to use several species of entheogenic mushrooms (Psilocybe spp, Boletus manicus).

Kava or kava kava (Piper Methysticum) has been cultivated for at least 3,000 years by a number of Pacific island-dwelling peoples. Historically, most Polynesian, many Melanesian, and some Micronesian cultures have ingested the psychoactive pulverized root, typically taking it mixed with water.  In these traditions, taking kava is believed to facilitate contact with the spirits of the dead, especially relatives and ancestors.

Research 

Notable early testing of the entheogenic experience includes the Marsh Chapel Experiment, conducted by physician and theology doctoral candidate Walter Pahnke under the supervision of psychologist Timothy Leary and the Harvard Psilocybin Project. In this double-blind experiment, volunteer graduate school divinity students from the Boston area almost all claimed to have had profound religious experiences subsequent to the ingestion of pure psilocybin.

Beginning in 2006, experiments have been conducted at Johns Hopkins University, showing that under controlled conditions psilocybin causes mystical experiences in most participants and that they rank the personal and spiritual meaningfulness of the experiences very highly.

Except in Mexico, research with psychedelics is limited due to ongoing widespread drug prohibition. The amount of peer-reviewed research on psychedelics has accordingly been limited due to the difficulty of getting approval from institutional review boards. Furthermore, scientific studies on entheogens present some significant challenges to investigators, including philosophical questions relating to ontology, epistemology and objectivity.

Legal status 

Some countries have legislation that allows for traditional entheogen use.

Australia

Between 2011 and 2012, the Australian Federal Government was considering changes to the Australian Criminal Code that would classify any plants containing any amount of DMT as "controlled plants". DMT itself was already controlled under current laws. The proposed changes included other similar blanket bans for other substances, such as a ban on any and all plants containing mescaline or ephedrine. The proposal was not pursued after political embarrassment on realisation that this would make the official Floral Emblem of Australia, Acacia pycnantha (golden wattle), illegal. The Therapeutic Goods Administration and federal authority had considered a motion to ban the same, but this was withdrawn in May 2012 (as DMT may still hold potential entheogenic value to native or religious peoples).

United States 
In 1963 in Sherbert v. Verner the Supreme Court established the Sherbert Test, which consists of four criteria that are used to determine if an individual's right to religious free exercise has been violated by the government. The test is as follows:

For the individual, the court must determine
 whether the person has a claim involving a sincere religious belief, and
 whether the government action is a substantial burden on the person's ability to act on that belief.

If these two elements are established, then the government must prove
 that it is acting in furtherance of a "compelling state interest", and
 that it has pursued that interest in the manner least restrictive, or least burdensome, to religion.

This test was eventually all-but-eliminated in Employment Division v. Smith 494 U.S. 872 (1990) which held that a "neutral law of general applicability" was not subject to the test. Congress resurrected it for the purposes of federal law in the federal Religious Freedom Restoration Act (RFRA) of 1993.

In City of Boerne v. Flores, 521 U.S. 507 (1997) RFRA was held to trespass on state sovereignty, and application of the RFRA was essentially limited to federal law enforcement. In Gonzales v. O Centro Espírita Beneficente União do Vegetal, 546 U.S. 418 (2006), a case involving only federal law, RFRA was held to permit a church's use of a DMT-containing tea for religious ceremonies.

Some states have enacted State Religious Freedom Restoration Acts intended to mirror the federal RFRA's protections.

Peyote is listed by the United States DEA as a Schedule I controlled substance.  However, practitioners of the Peyote Way Church of God, a Native American religion, perceive the regulations regarding the use of peyote as discriminating, leading to religious discrimination issues regarding about the U.S. policy towards drugs. As the result of Peyote Way Church of God, Inc. v. Thornburgh the American Indian Religious Freedom Act of 1978 was passed.  This federal statute allow the "Traditional Indian religious use of the peyote sacrament", exempting only use by Native American persons.

In literature 
Many works of literature have described entheogen use; some of those are:
 The drug melange (spice) in Frank Herbert's Dune universe acts as both an entheogen (in large enough quantities) and an addictive geriatric medicine. Control of the supply of melange was crucial to the Empire, as it was necessary for, among other things, faster-than-light (folding space) navigation.
 Consumption of the imaginary mushroom anochi [enoki] as the entheogen underlying the creation of Christianity is the premise of Philip K. Dick's last novel, The Transmigration of Timothy Archer, a theme that seems to be inspired by John Allegro's book.
 Aldous Huxley's final novel, Island (1962), depicted a fictional psychoactive mushroomtermed "moksha medicine"used by the people of Pala in rites of passage, such as the transition to adulthood and at the end of life.
 Bruce Sterling's Holy Fire novel refers to the religion in the future as a result of entheogens, used freely by the population.
 In Stephen King's The Dark Tower: The Gunslinger, Book 1 of The Dark Tower series, the main character receives guidance after taking mescaline.
 The Alastair Reynolds novel Absolution Gap features a moon under the control of a religious government that uses neurological viruses to induce religious faith.
 A critical examination of the ethical and societal implications and relevance of "entheogenic" experiences can be found in Daniel Waterman and Casey William Hardison's book Entheogens, Society & Law: Towards a Politics of Consciousness, Autonomy and Responsibility (Melrose, Oxford 2013). This book includes a controversial analysis of the term entheogen arguing that Wasson et al. were mystifying the effects of the plants and traditions to which it refers.

See also 
 List of Acacia species known to contain psychoactive alkaloids
 List of plants used for smoking
 List of psychoactive plants
 List of psychoactive plants, fungi, and animals
 List of substances used in rituals
 N,N-Dimethyltryptamine
 Psilocybin mushrooms
 Psychedelic therapy
 Psychoactive Amanita mushrooms
 Psychoactive cacti
 Psychology of religion
 Scholarly approaches to mysticism
 Stela of the cactus bearer

References

Further reading 

 Harner, Michael, The Way of the Shaman: A Guide to Power and Healing, Harper & Row Publishers, NY 1980
 Rätsch, Christian; "The Psychoactive Plants, Ethnopharmacology and Its Applications"; Park Street Press; Rochester Vermont; 1998/2005; 

 Roberts, Thomas B. (editor) (2001). Psychoactive Sacramentals: Essays on Entheogens and Religion San Francisco: Council on Spiritual Practices.
 Roberts, Thomas B. (2006) "Chemical Input, Religious Output—Entheogens" Chapter 10 in Where God and Science Meet: Vol. 3: The Psychology of Religious Experience Westport, CT: Praeger/Greenwood.
 Roberts, Thomas, and Hruby, Paula J. (1995–2003). Religion and Psychoactive Sacraments: An Entheogen Chrestomathy https://web.archive.org/web/20071111053855/http://csp.org/chrestomathy/ [Online archive]

 
 
 
 Stafford, Peter. (2003). Psychedelics. Ronin Publishing, Oakland, California. .
 Carl Ruck and Danny Staples, The World of Classical Myth 1994. Introductory excerpts
 Huston Smith, Cleansing the Doors of Perception: The Religious Significance of Entheogenic Plants and Chemicals, 2000, Tarcher/Putnam, 
 Daniel Pinchbeck,"Ten Years of Therapy in One Night", The Guardian UK (2003), describes Daniel's second journey with Iboga facilitated by Dr. Martin Polanco at the Ibogaine Association clinic in Rosarito, Mexico.
 Giorgio Samorini 1995 "Traditional use of psychoactive mushrooms in Ivory Coast?" in Eleusis 1 22-27 (no current url)
 M. Bock 2000 "Māori kava (Macropiper excelsum)" in Eleusis - Journal of Psychoactive Plants & Compounds n.s. vol 4 (no current url)
 Plants of the Gods: Their Sacred, Healing and Hallucinogenic Powers by Richard Evans Schultes, Albert Hofmann, Christian Ratsch - 
 John J. McGraw, Brain & Belief: An Exploration of the Human Soul, 2004, AEGIS PRESS, 
 J.R. Hale, J.Z. de Boer, J.P. Chanton and H.A. Spiller (2003) Questioning the Delphic Oracle, 2003, Scientific American, vol 289, no 2, 67-73.
 The Sacred Plants of our Ancestors by Christian Rätsch, published in TYR: Myth—Culture—Tradition Vol. 2, 2003–2004 - 
 Yadhu N. Singh, editor, Kava: From Ethnology to Pharmacology, 2004, Taylor & Francis,

External links

1979 neologisms
 
Religious practices
Shamanism
Spirituality
Drug classes defined by psychological effects
Drugs with non-standard legal status
Drug culture
Spiritual practice